In mathematics, the Rogers–Ramanujan identities are two identities related to basic hypergeometric series and integer partitions. Ramanujan had no proof, but rediscovered Rogers's paper in 1917, and they then published a joint new proof .  independently rediscovered and proved the identities.

Definition
The Rogers–Ramanujan identities are

 
and

 .

Here,  denotes the  q-Pochhammer symbol.

Combinatorial interpretation
Consider the following:
  is the generating function for partitions with exactly  parts such that adjacent parts have difference at least 2.
  is the generating function for partitions such that each part is congruent to either 1 or 4 modulo 5.
  is the generating function for partitions with exactly  parts such that adjacent parts have difference at least 2 and such that the smallest part is at least 2.
  is the generating function for partitions such that each part is congruent to either 2 or 3 modulo 5.

The Rogers–Ramanujan identities could be now interpreted in the following way. Let  be a non-negative integer.
 The number of partitions of  such that the adjacent parts differ by at least 2 is the same as the number of partitions of  such that each part is congruent to either 1 or 4 modulo 5.
 The number of partitions of  such that the adjacent parts differ by at least 2 and such that the smallest part is at least 2 is the same as the number of partitions of  such that each part is congruent to either 2 or 3 modulo 5.

Alternatively,
 The number of partitions of  such that with  parts the smallest part is at least  is the same as the number of partitions of  such that each part is congruent to either 1 or 4 modulo 5.
 The number of partitions of  such that with  parts the smallest part is at least  is the same as the number of partitions of  such that each part is congruent to either 2 or 3 modulo 5.

Modular functions
If q = e2πiτ, then q−1/60G(q) and q11/60H(q) are modular functions of τ.

Applications
The Rogers–Ramanujan identities appeared in Baxter's solution of the hard hexagon model in statistical mechanics.

Ramanujan's continued fraction is

Relations to affine Lie algebras and vertex operator algebras
James Lepowsky and Robert Lee Wilson were the first to prove Rogers–Ramanujan identities using completely representation-theoretic techniques. They proved these identities using level 3 modules for the affine Lie algebra . In the course of this proof they invented and used what they called -algebras. 
Lepowsky and Wilson's approach is universal, in that it is able to treat all affine Lie algebras at all levels.
It can be used to find (and prove) new partition identities. 
First such example is that of Capparelli's identities discovered by Stefano Capparelli using level 3 modules for 
the affine Lie algebra .

See also

Rogers polynomials
Continuous q-Hermite polynomials

References

 W.N. Bailey, Generalized Hypergeometric Series, (1935) Cambridge Tracts in Mathematics and Mathematical Physics, No.32, Cambridge University Press, Cambridge.
 George Gasper and Mizan Rahman, Basic Hypergeometric Series, 2nd Edition, (2004), Encyclopedia of Mathematics and Its Applications, 96, Cambridge University Press, Cambridge. .
 Bruce C. Berndt, Heng Huat Chan, Sen-Shan Huang, Soon-Yi Kang, Jaebum Sohn, Seung Hwan Son, The Rogers-Ramanujan Continued Fraction, J. Comput. Appl. Math. 105 (1999), pp. 9–24.
 Cilanne Boulet, Igor Pak, A Combinatorial Proof of the Rogers-Ramanujan and Schur Identities, Journal of Combinatorial Theory, Ser. A, vol. 113 (2006), 1019–1030.

 James Lepowsky and Robert L. Wilson, Construction of the affine Lie algebra , Comm. Math. Phys. 62 (1978) 43-53. 
 James Lepowsky and Robert L. Wilson, A new family of algebras underlying the Rogers-Ramanujan identities, Proc. Natl. Acad. Sci. USA 78 (1981), 7254-7258. 
 James Lepowsky and Robert L. Wilson, The structure of standard modules, I: Universal algebras and the Rogers-Ramanujan identities, Invent. Math. 77 (1984), 199-290.
 James Lepowsky and Robert L. Wilson, The structure of standard modules, II: The case , principal gradation, Invent. Math. 79 (1985), 417-442.
 Stefano Capparelli, Vertex operator relations for affine algebras and combinatorial identities'', Thesis (Ph.D.)–Rutgers The State University of New Jersey - New Brunswick. 1988. 107 pp.

External links

Hypergeometric functions
Integer partitions
Mathematical identities
Q-analogs
Modular forms
Srinivasa Ramanujan